SS Peter Minuit was a Liberty ship built in the United States during World War II. She was named after Peter Minuit, a Walloon from Tournai, in present-day Belgium. He was the 3rd Director of the Dutch North American colony of New Netherland from 1626 until 1631, and 3rd Governor of New Netherland. He founded the Swedish colony of New Sweden on the Delaware Peninsula in 1638. Minuit is generally credited with orchestrating the purchase of Manhattan Island for the Dutch from the Lenape Native Americans. Manhattan later became the site of the Dutch city of New Amsterdam, and the borough of Manhattan of modern-day New York City.

Construction
Peter Minuit was laid down on 28 January 1942, under a Maritime Commission (MARCOM) contract, MCE hull 35, by the Bethlehem-Fairfield Shipyard, Baltimore, Maryland; and was launched on 23 April 1942.

History
She was allocated to Grace Line, Inc., on 27 May 1942. On 14 June 1948, she was laid up in the National Defense Reserve Fleet, Beaumont, Texas. On 11 March 1963, she was sold for scrapping to Southern Scrap Material Co., Ltd., for $46,359.79. She was withdrawn from the fleet on 19 April 1963.

References

Bibliography

 
 
 
 

 

Liberty ships
Ships built in Baltimore
1942 ships
Beaumont Reserve Fleet